Boxing competitions at the 2021 Junior Pan American Games in Cali, Colombia were scheduled to be held from November 26 until December 1, 2021.

Medal summary

Medal table

Medalists

Men's

Women's

References

Boxing
Pan American Games
Qualification tournaments for the 2023 Pan American Games